= C2H2N2 =

The molecular formula C_{2}H_{2}N_{2} (molar mass: 54.05 g/mol, exact mass: 54.0217 u) may refer to:

- Ethenediimine
- Hydron dicyanide
- Azacyclopropenylidenimine
- N-cyanomethanimine
- Diazete
